Lingzhou may refer to:

菱洲 - a famous park in Nanjing (pronounced the same as 灵州)
灵洲山 - a mountain in Guangdong, China
灵州 - the old name of Lingwu, China